The Bahraini King's Cup is a cup competition involving teams from the Bahraini Premier League and 2nd tier. Muharraq are the current holders of the King's Cup, having defeated Riffa in last year's final.

Manama defeated Muharraq in the final to win their first King's Cup.

Preliminary round

|}

Round of 16

|}

Quarter-finals

|}

Semi-finals

|}

Final

|}

External links
2016–17 Bahraini King's Cup, Soccerway.com

References

Bahraini King's Cup seasons
King's Cup
Bahrain